Ahmadun (also Romanized as Aḩmadūn; also known as Aḩmadān) is a village in Fishvar Rural District, Evaz District, Larestan County, Fars Province, Iran. At the 2006 census, its population was 31, in 7 families.

References 

Populated places in Evaz County